"Rockin' in Rhythm" is a jazz instrumental originally performed by Duke Ellington and his big band, and credited to Ellington, Harry Carney and Irving Mills. It was first recorded in January 1931 at the Cotton Club.

Later recordings
Ellington later reworked the tune as part of "Kinda Dukish" which appeared in his 1960 album Piano in the Background.

"Rockin' in Rhythm" was one of the melodies which featured in the 1986 BBC television series The Singing Detective by Dennis Potter.

Versions
Ella Fitzgerald on Ella Fitzgerald Sings the Duke Ellington Song Book
Ella Fitzgerald on Fine and Mellow
Sonny Criss on Rockin' in Rhythm
Weather Report on Night Passage
Charlie Barnet recording of 06-19-1940, as played on KCEA.org 4/30/2014, 1:24 PM PDT
Richard Thompson on Strict Tempo!
Harry James on Harry James...Today (MGM E-3848, 1960)
The Swingville All-Stars (Taft Jordan, Hilton Jefferson, Al Sears) on Rockin' in Rhythm (Swingville, 1960)

References

Compositions by Duke Ellington
1931 compositions